John Hayes (1786?–1866) was a British portrait-painter. He died aged 80.

Works

Hayes first exhibited in the Royal Academy in 1814. He continued to show there to 1851; his contributions were chiefly portraits, though he occasionally sent a subject picture. Hayes had a good practice as a portrait-painter. His portrait of Agnes Strickland was engraved by Frederick Christian Lewis, as frontispiece to her Lives of the Queens of England (1851).

Notes

Attribution

1786 births
1866 deaths
19th-century British painters
British male painters
British portrait painters
19th-century British male artists